The State is the second studio album by Canadian rock band Nickelback. "Leader of Men" was the lead single from this album, followed by "Old Enough",  "Breathe", and "Worthy to Say". The album held a peak position of number 130 on the Billboard 200. The album also held a peak position on Billboard Top Heatseekers Albums charts position number 3 in 2000. The album was the band's first album to be certified Gold in both Canada and in the United States. It later went Platinum in Canada in April 2002 and then went Platinum in 2008 in the United States.

Background
The State was recorded in early 1998, with the band investing $30,000 into the record. On September 1, 1998, The State was released independently with a blue album cover. The original release was limited to 5,000 copies. In September of the next year, it was reissued on EMI Canada, with a re-formatted version of the original cover (the words "Nickelback" and "The State" were originally in yellow, in the same size near the right edge of the cover; on the EMI reissue, the word "Nickelback" was made into a bigger font and "The State" rendered in white at the top of the cover). In 2000, it was reissued again on EMI Canada, this time with different artwork featuring a young boy in a jail cell. This was also the artwork used on the American, European, and Australian releases on Roadrunner Records. In 2000, The State reached the Billboard 200 peaking 130. To support The State, Nickelback toured with Creed, Sevendust, 3 Doors Down, and Stone Temple Pilots. In early 2001, the band played its final dates with Everclear. In March 2001, Nickelback won its first Juno Award for Best New Group.

The album had four singles: "Leader of Men", "Breathe", "Old Enough", and "Worthy to Say". "Leader of Men" and "Breathe" both charted on the top 10 Mainstream Rock Tracks.

Track listing

Singles

Personnel
Credits adapted from album's liner notes.

Nickelback
Chad Kroeger – lead vocals, guitar
Ryan Peake – guitar, backing vocals
Mike Kroeger – bass
Ryan Vikedal – drums (credited)
Mitch Guindon – drums (not credited, but performed on the album)

Production
Dale Penner – producer, engineer
Nickelback — producer
Dave Ashton — second engineer
GGGarth Richardson — mixing
G.E. Slavin Creative Design — graphic design in Coquitlam, British Columbia
Brett Zilahi — mastering at Metalworks in Mississauga, Ontario
Ken Grant — executive producer

Release history

Charts

Year-end charts

Certifications

Appearances
The song "Old Enough" was featured on the soundtrack to the film Book of Shadows: Blair Witch 2 in 2000.
The songs "Diggin' This" and "Hold Out Your Hand" were featured in the film The Forsaken in 2001. 
The song "Leader of Men" was featured on the soundtrack to the movie Soul Assassin in 2001.
The song "Breathe" was featured on the soundtrack to the movie Clockstoppers in 2002.

Notes
1. Incorrectly titled "Leader of Men (Accoustic)" on the back insert of the original 1998 release.

2. Song from Curb (1996).

References

1999 albums
Nickelback albums
Roadrunner Records albums
Albums recorded at Greenhouse Studios

no:The State